Jodie Myers (born 23 March 1995) is a British judoka. She competed for England in the women's +78 kg event at the 2014 Commonwealth Games where she won a silver medal. Jodie went on to win a gold medal in the same category at the 2014 Junior European Judo Championships in Bucharest.

References

External links

1995 births
Living people
English female judoka
Commonwealth Games silver medallists for England
Judoka at the 2014 Commonwealth Games
Commonwealth Games medallists in judo
Medallists at the 2014 Commonwealth Games